Bongani Sandile Khumalo (born 6 January 1987) is a Liswati-born retired South African footballer who last played as a centre-back for Bidvest Wits and the South Africa national team.

Early life
Khumalo was born in Manzini but relocated to Pretoria, South Africa during his infancy. There, his late father was a language lecturer at the University of South Africa and his mother was a teacher. During his time in Pretoria, Khumalo studied towards a degree at the University of Pretoria while embarking on a professional football career. He later had to put his studies on hold, however, following a move to England. Upon his arrival in England, Khumalo was reported to have come from an impoverished background and being one of fifteen siblings. He later denied the reports, describing his family as middle class and confirming that he was an only child.

Club career

University of Pretoria
Having graduated from the Arcadia Shepherds academy, Khumalo signed for University of Pretoria in 2005. He spent two seasons at the club where he played in the National First Division
and scored four goals in 50 appearances. His form during his time in with University of Pretoria caught the eye of a number of South African Premier Division sides and in 2007 he signed for SuperSport United.

SuperSport United
Following his arrival at SuperSport United, Khumalo soon established himself as an important player in Gavin Hunt's side and was later named captain of the club. Over the course of the next three seasons, he helped the club to three consecutive Premier Division and became the youngest ever player to lift the league title, at the age of 23. Khumalo's spell with the club coincided with the SuperSport United entering into an affiliation agreement with Premier League club, Tottenham Hotspur, and in 2010 he signed a pre-contract to join the London-based club in January of the following year.

Tottenham Hotspur
On 26 October 2010, it was announced that Khumalo would be joining Tottenham Hotspur in January 2011 from partner club SuperSport United after a successful trial in September, subject to a work permit for a fee of £1.5 million. Tottenham confirmed the completion of Khumalo's transfer from SuperSport United on 7 January 2011.

Loan moves and release
On 24 March 2011, Khumalo made an emergency deadline day loan move to Championship club Preston North End. He made his debut for Preston on 2 April 2011 in their 2–1 victory over Swansea.

On 25 July 2011, Khumalo moved on a season-long loan to Championship club Reading. However following the arrival of Kaspars Gorkšs from Queens Park Rangers, Khumalo's appearances were limited, and he did not play a first team game after August. On 1 February 2012, it was confirmed that Khumalo's loan would be terminated early, to allow him to return to Tottenham.

On 6 July 2012, Khumalo joined Greek club PAOK on loan, for one year.

Khumalo was signed by Doncaster Rovers of the Championship for a season's loan on 31 July 2013. On 6 August in his second game for Rovers he scored the winner in a 1−0 victory against Rochdale in the League Cup.

On 14 March 2015, Khumalo joined Colchester United on loan for the rest of the season. He made ten appearances for the Colchester Community Stadium based club before returning to Tottenham.

Khumalo was released by Tottenham Hotspur at the end of 2014–15 season, without ever playing a competitive game for the club in 4.5 years.

Return to South Africa
On 4 August 2015, it was announced that Khumalo had signed for SuperSport United, leaving Tottenham Hotspur after four years and no competitive appearances. He made 10 appearances in all competitions for SuperSport before moving to fellow Premier Soccer League side Bidvest Wits.

Retirement
On 21 September 2021, it was announced that he is now retiring from football.

International career
Khumalo was named in the South Africa national team squad for the 2009 Confederations Cup and 2010 FIFA World Cup, both in South Africa. On 22 June 2010, he scored the first goal after 21 minutes against France as South Africa finished their World Cup campaign with a 2–1 win. Khumalo was captain of the national team at the 2013 African Cup of Nations.

International goals
Scores and results list South Africa's goal tally first, score column indicates score after each Khumalo goal.

References

External links
 
 
 

1987 births
Living people
People from Manzini
Swazi emigrants to South Africa
South African soccer players
South Africa international soccer players
Association football defenders
2009 FIFA Confederations Cup players
University of Pretoria F.C. players
University of Pretoria alumni
SuperSport United F.C. players
Tottenham Hotspur F.C. players
Preston North End F.C. players
Reading F.C. players
PAOK FC players
Doncaster Rovers F.C. players
Colchester United F.C. players
Bidvest Wits F.C. players
English Football League players
Super League Greece players
South African expatriate soccer players
South African expatriate sportspeople in England
Expatriate footballers in England
South African expatriate sportspeople in Greece
Expatriate footballers in Greece
2010 FIFA World Cup players
2013 Africa Cup of Nations players
South African people of Swazi descent